Old Tom ( 1895 – 17 September 1930) was a killer whale (orca) known to whalers in the port of Eden, New South Wales, on the southeast coast of Australia. Old Tom measured 22 feet (6.7 m) and weighed 6 tons, with a 3.33 feet (1 m) skull and teeth about 5.31 inches (13.4 cm) long. Old Tom was thought to be the leader of a pod of killer whales which helped the whalers by herding baleen whales into Twofold Bay. This pod was also known as "the killers of Eden".

On 17 September 1930, Old Tom was found dead in Twofold Bay. Before his death, he had been thought to be over 90 years old, assisting three generations of the Davidson family when whaling. Examination of his teeth indicated he died around age 35, but this method of age determination is now believed to be inaccurate for older animals.

Old Tom's bones were preserved and his skeleton is now on display in the Eden Killer Whale Museum.

Eden, Whaling and the Davidson family 
The Davidson family was the only group of whalers that resided in Eden year-round. They relied on traditional whaling techniques, such as row boats and hand harpoons, that did not disturb or put stress on the killer whales with loud noise, while also reducing operating costs.

Eden 
Eden, first established in 1842, is located 470 km south of Sydney, in the greater area of Twofold Bay. It is a town with dense forests to the west and the sea to the east. Eden wharf is located in Snug Cove, opposite of Davidson whaling station, located in Kiah Inlet. Leatherjacket Bay, outside of South Head, was frequently used by the killer whales as a forward base. Eden is mostly known for its significance to the whaling history in Australia in the 19th century.

Indigenous Australian History 

Around 10,000 years ago, the friendship between killer whales, referred to as "beowas" (= brothers in English) and whalers began with the Katunga, the Indigenous Australian whalers. The Katunga, translated to sea coast people or saltwater people, saw killer whales as their reincarnated ancestors, whalers in particular, due to the similarity in coloration of the killer whales and the traditional black and white clothing worn during their corroboree ceremonies. During this ceremony people interact with the Dreamtime through dance, music and costumes. The belief of killer whales harbouring the souls of the lost whalers occurred with the coincidence of a new killer whale appearing each time a whaler passed away. Killer whales were seen as "working-dogs": playful, helpful, and friendly.

Davidson family 
Alexander Davidson was a Scottish immigrant, who began shore-based whaling in 1857 with his son John. Their whaling station in Kiah Inlet was first built in the 1860s and was the longest running shore-based whaling station in Australia. The family utilised row boats and harpoons and did not advance with newer, more effective equipment, such as hand guns and motor boats. They say that this was to protect the killer whales from loud sounds and also to not scare them away. The three generations of the Davidson family all claimed to have old Tom assisting them on their whaling trips. Legend says that Old Tom would take the cable attached to the harpoon to pull the rowboat faster out to the open ocean. The relationship between killer whales and the Davidson family was based on mutual help: if a man would fall overboard during one of the whaling trips, the killer whales would protect the man from danger until he was back on board. Similarly, if killer whales became entangled in fishing lines, a whaler would cut them free. Indigenous Australian men were employed in the Davidson whaling crew, which is one factor that kept the Davidson whaling station going for so long. They were employed on the same terms as whites, which is one of the reasons the relationship between the killer whales and the Davidson whalers established.

George Davidson's was the only relationship that mirrored the depth of the bond between Indigenous Australian workers and the killer whales. This bond might have been established due to the whalers of the crew feeding Old Tom and other killer whales fish while waiting for passing whales. In later years, this was one of the main food sources for the killer whales. George died in 1952.

Law of Tongue 
The Law of Tongue is recognized as the “unspoken rule” between the killer whales and humans. This law refers to the process of whalers anchoring the whale carcass to either the bottom of the sea floor or in proximity to the shore, where the killer whales feed on the carcass. The primary target of the killer whales on most species of whales, specifically the baleen whales, are the tongue, the lips and the genital region. The blubber and bones remain unharmed and are then used by the whalers.

The law of tongue dates back to indigenous Australian history, similarly to the food offering to the "beowas" by locals for generations.

Old Tom 
Old Tom was present yearly during the migration season (May – September) from the 1860s to 17 September 1930, where he was found washed up dead close to shore by George Davidson. To present it is unclear whether Old Tom was a female or a male, and the exact age is also unknown. According to Davidson's oral family history, old Tom was present yearly for 80 years. Old Tom measured 6.7m (22 feet), with a 1.02m skull and 13.4 cm long teeth, weighing 6 tons. He was distinguishable by his extra long dorsal fin, with a bend at the top and his "sense of humour". The Davidson family described Tom as an athletic and skilful whale hunter, who would commonly be seen towing smaller fishing boats by their anchor line.

As killer whales pods are typically matrilineal, consisting of the mother and her immediate family, the mother is normally the leader of the pod, hence the sex of Tom is uncertain. His size was smaller than other male killer whales, however the average age and size of killer whales is determined by killers in captivity and due to the limited amount of whales in captivity the numbers are not accurate.

His pod 

Over the course of the whaling history in Eden, the pod of Old Tom returned every winter during the migration season occurring from late May until early September ). Throughout the course of 80 years the pod consisted of 20 – 30 killer whales. While the exact number of whales in the pod is unknown, 21 whales are known by name, identified by their differences in dorsal fins: Stranger, Jackson, Hooky, Humpy, Cooper, Typee, Big Ben, Young Ben, Kinscher, Jimmy, Sharkey, Charlie Adgery, Brierly, Albert, Youngster, Walker, Big Jack, Little Jack, Skinner, Montague.  Many of the names are derived from dead Aboriginal whalers. The pod distribution determines the food preferences, hence the killer whales in Twofold Bay would commonly be seen eating seals and dolphins while waiting for the migratory baleen whales.

Hunting methods of the Whale 
Orcas utilise countershading as camouflage, the black back makes them less visible from above and the white belly makes them less visible from below. This facilitates hunting. When hunting baleen whales, which range from 15 to 30 meters in size, the pod would divide into three groups. One group stayed in the open ocean, hindering escape, the second swam underneath the baleen whale to prevent it from diving deep, and the third attacked the whale. Attacks consisted of biting at the lips and fins, in addition to leaping on to the blowhole to drown the whale. After the whale was trapped in the bay, Old Tom would usually swim in front of the Davidson whaling station and perform “flop-tailing” to get the attention of the onshore whalers. Flop tailing describes the act of a whale slapping its tail on the water's surface. The sound of flop-tailing was followed by yells of "Rusho" on land, calling whalers to go out to sea. The whalers would then row out and harpoon the baleen whale.

In the open ocean, killer whales would distinguish the green row boats of the Davidson family, from the other white boats of competitors, and herd the baleen whales towards them.

Death and the end of whaling 
Whaling in Eden has declined since the death of Typee in 1901, who was killed by a local after stranding close to shore. This led the Indigenous Australian whalers to abandon Davidson's crew and Kiah Inlet. The shortage in workforce was matched by alternatives to whale oil and by a decline in killer whales and baleen whales due to increased modern ship-based whaling. No baleen whales were spotted in Eden after 1926, while Old Tom was still returning yearly until his death without his pod. Killer whales are sociable creatures, meaning they are rarely seen alone. The return of Old Tom alone to Twofold Bay has been interpreted as him returning to familiarity after losing the rest of his pod: Locals believe, the rest of Old Tom's pod was killed further north in Jervis bay by Norwegian whalers, unaware of the relationship between killer whales and whalers. Fishermen and whalers often regarded killer whales as competitors for their catch and retaliated with bullets and harpoons.

Death of Old Tom 
Old Tom was found dead on 17 September 1930, by George Davidson in the southern part of Twofold Bay. The cause of death is unknown, however experts believe that Old Tom died of his age and/or starvation due to worn down teeth. Killer whales commonly die of starvation due to worn-down teeth.

Rumours say that his death occurred after an accident caused by Davidson's shipmate, local retired pastoralist John Logan, during a storm. Logan fought Old Tom for the carcass of the whale, ending with Logan damaging some of Old Tom's teeth. This would eventually lead to the killer whale dying of starvation; a fate Logan was said to have felt guilty of inflicting from that day forward.

Teeth and the determination of Old Toms' age 
Determining the exact age of killer whales in the wild was not possible until present. The cross-section of the teeth is often used to determine the age, similar to how the rings in the tree trunks are used to determine the tree's age. According to researchers in 1977, Old Tom's age was stated to be around 35 years. However, three generations of Davidson family whalers claim to have whaled with assistance of Old Tom, making him up to 80 years old.Old Tom's fascination with mooring lines and towing out fishing/whaling boats out in the open ocean, reflected by the half-circular pattern on his teeth, is documented in the Killer Whale Museum. By the late 1800s, the killer whale tooth wear was documented widely, specifically the peculiar pattern of the teeth, by professors of physiology and anatomy at the University of Copenhagen or by the British Museum. Results stated that killer whale teeth naturally wear down over the span of their lifetime, resulting in exposed pulp cavities and abscesses.

Human-Orca Relationship 
Killer whales are the apex predators of the ocean, having no animal feed on them, while they feed on almost everything (beluga whales, mink whales, humpback whales, dolphins, other killer whales, seals, squid, fish, birds, etc.). However, humans are not the target of killer whales. There are many stories about shipwrecked sailors, e.g.in 1972 near Baja a sailor held on to his raft for hours, while three killer whales encircled him. There is one incident of an attack on a human in 1972, who survived. Killer whales usually spare humans, however humans will take out killer whales in fear of them interfering with their hunt. Similar relationships between Cetacean species and humans have been observed world-wide. While human-dolphin relationships are observed more frequently, relationships between killer whales and humans date back as early as the Roman times.

Present 
The Killer Whale Museum was established in 1931 after the death of Old Tom in 1930 to commemorate the story and significance of Old Tom. Besides the permanent exhibitions of the history of Eden and Old Tom, there are travelling exhibitions. The main attraction of the museum is the preserved skeleton of Old Tom. The museum is located on the northern side of Twofold Bay, next to the lighthouse, overlooking the ocean and giving the 50,000 yearly visitors the possibility to watch migratory whales. The original Davidson whaling station, in Kiah Inlet, is accessible to view as well.

Filmmaker George McKee produced an ABC documentary “Killers in Eden” in 2004 based on the story of Old Tom and the killers of Eden, describing the relationship between the killer whales, the Indigenous Australian whalers and the Davidson family.

See also
 Killer whales of Eden, Australia
 List of individual cetaceans

References

External links 
 Killers of Eden
 Eden Killer Whale Museum
 Whaling History, Sapphire Coast
 Sapphire Coast Marine Discovery Centre, a project to develop and build a public Marine Education and Research Centre
 Whaling History, Sapphire Coast Tourism, of enterprise of Bega Valley Shire Council

Articles containing video clips
1930s in New South Wales
Individual orcas
Individual wild animals
History of New South Wales
1930 animal deaths
Eden, New South Wales
Whaling in Australia